"Mná na hÉireann" is a poem written by Ulster poet Peadar Ó Doirnín (1704–1796), most famous as a song, and especially set to an air composed by Seán Ó Riada (1931–1971). As a modern song, Mná na hÉireann is usually placed in the category of Irish rebel music; as an eighteenth-century poem it belongs to the genre (related to the aisling) which imagines Ireland as a generous, beautiful woman suffering the depredations of an English master on her land, her cattle, or her self, and which demands Irishmen to defend her, or ponders why they fail to. The poem also seems to favour Ulster above the other Irish provinces. Ó Doirnín was part of the distinctive Airgíalla tradition of poetry, associated with southern Ulster and north Leinster; in this poem he focuses on Ulster place-names, and he sees the province as being particularly assaulted (for instance, he says that being poor with his woman would be better than being rich with herds of cows and the shrill queen who assailed Tyrone, in Ulster, i.e. Medb who attacked Cooley, as the borderlands of Ulster, which would have lain in ancient Airgíalla). This may be because, besides being the poet's home, until the success of the Plantation of Ulster the province had been the most militantly Gaelic of the Irish provinces in the sixteenth and seventeenth centuries.

Poem
Here is the Irish text of the poem. The verses most often performed by modern singers are the first two and the last.

Mná na hÉireann
Tá bean in Éirinn a phronnfadh séad domh is mo sháith le n-ól
Is tá bean in Éirinn is ba bhinne léithe mo ráfla ceoil
Ná seinm théad; atá bean in éirinn is níorbh fhearr léi beo
Mise ag léimnigh nó leagtha i gcré is mo thárr faoi fhód

Tá bean in Éirinn a bheadh ag éad liom mur' bhfaighfinn ach póg
Ó bhean ar aonach, nach ait an scéala, is mo dháimh féin leo;
Tá bean ab fhearr liom nó cath is céad dhíobh nach bhfagham go deo
Is tá cailín spéiriúil ag fear gan Bhéarla, dubhghránna cróin.

Tá bean i Laighnibh is nios mhiste léithe bheith límh liom ar bord,
Is tá bean i bhFearnmhaigh a ghéabhadh bhéarsai is is sárbhinne glór,
Bhí bean ar thaobh cnoic i gCarraig Éamoinn a níodh gáire ag ól
Is tráth bhí ina maighdin ní mise d'éignigh dá chois ó chomhar.

Tá bean a leafgfadh, nífead is d'fhuaifeadh cáimric is sról,
Is tá bean a dhéanfadh de dh'olainn gréas is thairnfeadh an bhró
Tá bean is b'fhearr leí ag cruinniú déirce nó cráite re cró
Is tá bean 'na ndéidh uile a luífeadh lé fear is a máthair faoi fhód

Tá bean a déarnadh an iomad tréanais is grá Dia mór,
Is tá bean nach mbéarfadh a mionna ar aon mhodh is nach n-ardódh glór;
Ach thaisbeáuin saorbhean a ghlacfadh lé fear go cráifeach cóir
Nach mairfeadh a ghléas is nach mbainfeadh léithe i gcás ar domhan.

Tá bean a déarfadh dá siulfainn léi go bhfaighinn an t-ór,
Is tá bean 'na léine is fearr a méin ná táinte bó
Le bean a bhuairfeadh Baile an Mhaoir is clár Thír Eoghain,
Is ní fheicim leigheas ar mo ghalar féin ach scaird a dh'ól

 There are several places called Carraig Éamainn (modern spelling), but the most likely is Carrickedmond townland in the author's home county, County Louth.
 The "fear dubhghránna gan Bhéarla" (darkly ugly man without English) who has possession of the poet's favoured woman is probably one of the Hanoverian kings of Great Britain – George I or George II – who were native German speakers and rumoured to be incompetent in English.
 The sixth and twelfth verses refer to the Táin Bó Cúailnge ("táinte bó") and Medb of Connacht, a powerful, legendary queen, known for her power, wealth in cattle and gold, her beauty, her many husbands and especially her war with Ulster to steal the king of that province's prize bull.

Women of Ireland (Kate Bush version)
This is the translation performed by Kate Bush on the album Common Ground – Voices of Modern Irish Music. No translator is given, but the song is credited as arranged by Bush with Dónal Lunny and Fiachra Trench.

There's a woman in Ireland who'd give me a gem and my fill to drink,
There's a woman in Ireland to whom my singing is sweeter than the music of strings
There's a woman in Ireland who would much prefer me leaping
Than laid in the clay and my belly under the sod

There's a woman in Ireland who'd envy me if I got naught but a kiss
From a woman at a fair, isn't it strange, and the love I have for them
There's a woman I'd prefer to a battalion, and a hundred of them whom I will never get
And an ugly, swarthy man with no English has a beautiful girl

There's a woman who would say that if I walked with her I'd get the gold
And there's the woman of the shirt whose mien is better than herds of cows
With a woman who would deafen Baile an Mhaoir and the plain of Tyrone
And I see no cure for my disease but to drink a torrent

Women of Ireland (Michael Davitt version)
This translation (of the same three verses) is by Michael Davitt. Davitt plays with the second couplet of each verse, reversing the meaning and turning the poem into the song of a womanising drunkard, who favours no particular woman (second verse), resorts to drink instead of avoiding it (third verse—though this may be ironic in the original), and whom his lover wants dead (first verse).

There's a woman in Erin who'd give me shelter and my fill of ale;
There's a woman in Ireland who'd prefer my strains to strings being played;
There's a woman in Eirinn and nothing would please her more
Than to see me burning or in a grave lying cold.

There's a woman in Eirinn who'd be mad with envy if I was kissed
By another on fair-day, they have strange ways, but I love them all;
There are women I'll always adore, battalions of women and more
And there's this sensuous beauty and she shackled to an ugly boar.

There's a woman who promised if I'd wander with her I'd find some gold
A woman in night dress with a loveliness worth more than the woman
Who vexed Ballymoyer and the plain of Tyrone;
And the only cure for my pain I'm sure is the ale-house down the road.

Song and melody

Recordings
The poem in song form was first recorded by Ceoltóirí Chualann, with lead vocal by Seán O Sé (on the 1969 live album Ó Riada Sa Gaiety). Subsequent recordings include:
A famous instrumental version by The Chieftains (the offshoot of Ceoltórí Chuallann) on their 1973 album The Chieftains 4.
An instrumental version by Na Connerys.
An arrangement by Bob James was included in his 1976 album Bob James Three.
An instrumental arrangement by guitarist Davy Graham was included in his reissue 1978 album The Complete Guitarist in 1999 
An instrumental version was included on Oakenshield's first album, Across The Narrow Seas in 1983.
Guitarist Ronnie Montrose recorded an instrumental version for his 1986 recording Territory.
English soul band The Christians used the tune for their song "Words", recorded in 1989.  This reached the No. 18 position in the UK Singles Chart.
Alan Stivell made a version, sung in Irish, accompanying himself with a metal strung Celtic harp, on his 1995 album Brian Boru.
Sinéad O'Connor recorded a version for the 1995 compilation CD, Ain't Nuthin' But a She Thing, in connection with a multi-artist television special for MTV.
Mike Oldfield recorded an instrumental version of the song on his 1996 album, Voyager.
Sarah Brightman performed a version called "So Many Things" on her album Eden, released in 1998. Brightman also performed the song at her One Night in Eden concert, recorded at Sun City, South Africa, later released on DVD.
French singer Nolwenn Leroy recorded her own version on her album Bretonne, released on 6 December 2010.
Jeff Beck performed a version at the Crossroads Guitar Festival 2013. It appears on the album from the festival.
Sharon Corr, formerly of The Corrs, has made at least two recordings of this tune with the RTÉ Radio Orchestra, and occasionally includes the song in her concert repertoire.
Patricia Petibon, Susan Manoff, Ronan Lebars on the 2020 album, L'Amour, la Mort, La Mer
Irish music group Celtic Woman covered the song on their 2018 album Ancient Land.
English singer songwriter Kate Bush (Catherine Bush CBE) also recorded a version. Bush recorded her rendition in 1995 for the 1996 compilation album Common Ground - Voices of Modern Irish Music. The track then featured on her compilation album ‘The Other Sides-2018 remaster’ which includes some of her unknown work, b-sides and unreleased work.

Live performances
The song is also a frequently played song at concerts. One example of a notable act performing "Women of Ireland" is guitarist Jeff Beck, who at times performs it with Irish violinist Sharon Corr.  It also appears on her first solo album, Dream of You.

Use in film and television
"Women of Ireland" has been used in various film and television productions.
 The Chieftains version of the song features prominently on the soundtrack to Stanley Kubrick's 1975 film Barry Lyndon.
 Soundtrack of a Levi's jeans advertisement.
 This was also the slow air whistled by Emilio Estevez as Billy the Kid in the 1988 western film, Young Guns.
 A partial instrumental version is used in the soundtrack of the 1999 Chinese film Postmen in the Mountains.
 An instrumental version of the song was used as background music in the 2009 BBC documentary about the mixed fortunes of the Harris Tweed industry.
 An adaptation of the Chieftains version is featured in Carl Colpaert's 2010 film The Land of the Astronauts.
 Used in courtship scene of Robin & Marion in Ridley Scott's 2010 film Robin Hood.

References 

1969 songs
Irish poems
Irish-language literature
18th-century poems
Irish-language songs